The 1938–39 Connecticut State Huskies men's basketball team represented Connecticut State College, now the University of Connecticut, in the 1938–39 collegiate men's basketball season. The Huskies completed the season with a 12–6 overall record. The Huskies were members of the New England Conference, where they ended the season with a 6–2 record. The Huskies played their home games at Hawley Armory in Storrs, Connecticut, and were led by third-year head coach Don White.

Schedule 

|-
!colspan=12 style=""| Regular Season

Schedule Source:

References 

UConn Huskies men's basketball seasons
Connecticut
1938 in sports in Connecticut
1939 in sports in Connecticut